Indulekha  is an Indian Malayalam television series directed by Githesh Karunakaran.The show premiered on Surya TV on 5 October 2020. It stars Malavika Krishnadas and Ameen Madathil in lead roles along Balu Menon, Uma Nair, Manoj Nair and Manju Satheesh. All episodes of this show streaming on Sun NXT. The show marked the television debut of Ranji Panicker. Show  went off air abruptly on 7 May 2021 due to COVID-19 situation and due to low TRP ratings.

Synopsis

The story is about a girl named Indulekha, who faces the death of her father, loss of their vast wealth and is forced out of their house, along with her mother and sister, all on her wedding day. Follow Indulekha, on her journey of survival as she rises from the ashes, to regain her family's lost glory and reclaim what is rightfully hers.

Cast

Main
Malavika Krishnadas as Indulekha Ramanadha Menon (Indu) – Ramanadha Menon's eldest daughter.  
Ameen Madathil as Kalappurakkal Devaprasad (Devan) – Indulekha's fiancee. A young school teacher determined to support his love through thick and thin.

Recurring
Uma Nair as Kalappurakkal Gowri Lakshmi (Chechiyamma) – Devan, Shivan and Vishnu's elder sister and motherly figure.
Balu Menon as Kalappurakkal Mahadevan Thampi (Chettachan) – Gouri's Husband 
Renjith Menon as Kalappurakkal Shivaprasad (Shivan) – Devan's elder brother
Akarsh Prakash as Kalappurakkal Vishnuprasad (Vishnu) – Devan and Shivan's younger brother
Della George as Valiya Maliyekkal Mahitha – Urmila's daughter. Was in love with Devan but as he denied her love she is all set to marry Shivan instead to create problems in the Kalappurakkal family.
Julie Hendry as Karthika – Indu's sister
Divya Menon / Sumi Santhosh  as Kanimangalam Savithri Menon – Indu's mother and Menon's widowed wife.
Manoj Nair as Valiya Maliyekkal Thrivikraman Unni – Urmila's brother
Manju Satheesh as Valiya Maliyekkal Urmila – Thrivikraman's sister
Shari Krishnan as Saira – Shivan's Wife
Ameya Nair as Lathakumari IPS (Latha)
Venki as DYSP Pradeep Kumar
Maneesh Krishna as Valiya Maliyekkal Vijayan Unni– Thrivikraman's son and Karthika's lover.
Pavithran as Adv. Rajasekharan
Mani Mayampilli as Thilakan
Kottayam Pradeep as Madhavan – Urmila's husband
Krishnathulasi Bayi as Revathi – Thrivikraman's wife

Extended cameo
Renji Panicker as Kanimangalam Ramanatha Menon – Indulekha's late father

References

External links

Indulekha on Sun NXT

Malayalam-language television shows
Surya TV original programming
2020s Indian television series